Zion Johnson (born November 18, 1999) is an American football guard for the Los Angeles Chargers of the National Football League (NFL). He played college football at Davidson before transferring to Boston College where was named an All-American in 2021. Johnson was drafted by the Chargers in the first round of the 2022 NFL Draft.

Early life and high school
Johnson was born on November 18, 1999, and grew up in Bowie, Maryland, before attending Riverdale Baptist School in Upper Marlboro, Maryland. Before playing Football, Johnson played golf. While in high school and college, he was a pathways intern at the National Institutes of Health.

College career
Johnson began his collegiate career at Davidson College. He played in all 22 of the Wildcats' games with 19 starts over two seasons and was named first team All-Pioneer Football League as a sophomore. Johnson transferred to Boston College following his sophomore year. Johnson said "Boston College for me was a no-brainer" and that he chose it because the school was renowned academically.

Johnson started seven games at left guard in his first season at Boston College and was named second team All-Atlantic Coast Conference (ACC) after he was named the conference Offensive Lineman of the Week three times. He was moved to left tackle before his senior season and was named third team All-ACC after starting all 11 of the Eagles' games. After considering entering the 2021 NFL Draft, Johnson decided to utilize the extra year of eligibility granted to college athletes who played in the 2020 season due to the coronavirus pandemic and return to Boston College for a fifth season He moved back to the guard position for his final season and was named first team All-ACC and a first team All-American by the Walter Camp Football Foundation.

Professional career

Johnson was selected with the 17th overall pick by the Los Angeles Chargers in the 2022 NFL Draft.

References

External links 
 Los Angeles Chargers bio
 Boston College Eagles bio
 Davidson Wildcats bio

1999 births
Living people
Players of American football from Maryland
American football offensive guards
Davidson Wildcats football players
Boston College Eagles football players
All-American college football players
Los Angeles Chargers players
National Institutes of Health people